John Gaillard (September 5, 1765 – February 26, 1826) was a U.S. Senator from South Carolina.

Gaillard was born in St. Stephen's district, South Carolina, on September 5, 1765. He was of Huguenot descent. He was elected to the United States Senate in place of Pierce Butler, who resigned, and served from December 6, 1804, until his death in Washington, D.C., on February 26, 1826. During his tenure, Gaillard voted for the War of 1812. He served as President pro tempore of the Senate during part of the 11th Congress and at least part of every Congress from the 13th to the 18th. He was also first in the presidential line of succession from November 25, 1814, two days after the death of Vice President Elbridge Gerry, to March 4, 1817. He was the longest-serving Senator in U.S. history at the time of his death.

In his memoir Thirty Years' View, Thomas H. Benton, one of Gaillard's contemporaries, described him thus: 
Urbane in his manners, amiable in temper, scrupulously impartial, uniting absolute firmness of purpose with the greatest gentleness of manners—such were the qualifications which commended him to the presidency of the senate. There was probably not an instance of disorder or a disagreeable scene in the chamber during his long-continued presidency. He classed democratically, but was as much the favorite of one side of the house as of the other, and that in the high party times of the war with Great Britain, which so much exasperated party spirit.

Gaillard died in Washington, D.C., on February 26, 1826, and was interred in the Congressional Cemetery.

See also
List of United States Congress members who died in office (1790–1899)

External links

 Political Graveyard

United States senators from South Carolina
Burials at the Congressional Cemetery
1765 births
1826 deaths
South Carolina Democratic-Republicans
Democratic-Republican Party United States senators
Presidents pro tempore of the United States Senate